Marcia F. Bartusiak is an author, journalist, and Professor of the Practice Emeritus of the Graduate Program in Science Writing at the Massachusetts Institute of Technology. Trained in both communications (B.A. from American University, 1971) and physics (M.S. from Old Dominion University, 1979), she writes about the fields of astronomy and physics. Bartusiak has been published in National Geographic, Discover, Astronomy, Sky & Telescope, Science, Popular Science, World Book Encyclopedia, Smithsonian, and MIT Technology Review. The author of seven books, she is also a columnist for Natural History magazine.

Education and career
Bartusiak started her career in 1971 as the first female reporter at WVEC-TV (ABC affiliate) in Norfolk, Virginia.  She also served for a period as the station's first female anchor before leaving in 1975 to begin a graduate education in physics. After receiving her master's degree, she became a charter member of the writing staff of Discover magazine, when it first started up in 1980, and then began a freelance science-writing career in 1982.   In 2003, she joined the faculty of the MIT Graduate Program in Science Writing, retiring in 2019 as a professor emeritus.

Books
 Dispatches from Planet 3, a collection of cosmological essays
Einstein's Unfinished Symphony, a narrative overview of the new field of gravitational-wave astronomy
 Black Hole: How an Idea Abandoned by Newtonians, Hated by Einstein, and Gambled on by Hawking Became Loved
 Through a Universe Darkly, a history of astronomers' centuries-long quest to discover the universe's composition
 Thursday's Universe, a layman's guide to the frontiers of astrophysics and cosmology
 The Day We Found the Universe, a narrative saga of the birth of modern cosmology
 Archives of the Universe, a history of the major discoveries in astronomy told through 100 of the original scientific publications

Awards
Bartusiak has three times won the American Institute of Physics Science Writing Award:  in 2019 for Dispatches from Planet 3, in 2001 for Einstein's Unfinished Symphony and in 1982 for The Ultimate Timepiece in Discover Magazine.  In 2010 The Day We Found the Universe won the History of Science Society's Watson Davis and Helen Miles Davis Prize. Bartusiak won the 2006 American Institute of Physics Andrew W. Gemant Award. "The Andrew Gemant Award recognizes the accomplishments of a person who has made significant contributions to the cultural, artistic, or humanistic dimension of physics given annually." In 2008 she was elected a Fellow of the American Association for the Advancement of Science for “exceptionally clear communication of the rich history, the intricate nature, and the modern practice of astronomy to the public at large" and was also chosen to be a 2022-23 Distinguished Lecturer for Sigma Xi, the scientific research honor society.

Bibliography

References

External links 
 
 

American science writers
Year of birth missing (living people)
Living people
MIT School of Humanities, Arts, and Social Sciences faculty
Discover (magazine) people